Good Luck, Kid is the third studio album by American band Joseph. It was released by ATO Records on September 13, 2019. Produced by Christian "Leggy" Langdon, it reached number four on Billboards Heatseekers Albums chart.

Track listing

Charts

Release history

References

External links
 

2019 albums
Joseph (band) albums
ATO Records albums